The Journal of Cardiac Failure is a peer-reviewed medical journal published by Elsevier on behalf of the Heart Failure Society of America. It covers cardiology. The editor-in-chief is Robert Mentz. According to the Journal Citation Reports, the journal has a 2021 impact factor of 5.712.

References

External links
 

Cardiology journals
Publications established in 1994
Monthly journals